Reiu is a village in Häädemeeste Parish, Pärnu County in southwestern Estonia. As of 2011 Census, the settlement's population was 599.

The village is passed by the National road 4 (part of E67 or the Via Baltica), and is the starting point of the National road 6 (Valga–Uulu highway).

Reiu is the location of Lottemaa, a theme park inspired by the Lotte from Gadgetville. In Soviet times, the site was home to Kullipesa missile base.

In 2015, a new golf course (Pärnu Bay Golf Links), was opened in Reiu village.

The Raeküla Forest is located in the northern part of the village territory.

On 7 September 2015, Mereküla village was established by detaching the land from Reiu village.

References

External links
Lottemaa (Lotte Village Theme Park)
Pärnu Bay Golf Links

Villages in Pärnu County